Dolič is a Slovene place name that may refer to:

 Dolič Pass, a mountain pass in the Julian Alps west of Mount Triglav, northwestern Slovenia

Settlements
 Dolič, Destrnik, a village in the Municipality of Destrnik, northeastern Slovenia
 Dolič, Kuzma, a village in the Municipality of Kuzma, northeastern Slovenia
 Gornji Dolič, a village in the Municipality of Mislinja, northern Slovenia
 Spodnji Dolič, a village in the Municipality of Vitanje, northeastern Slovenia